Bestman is a surname. Notable people with the surname include:

Denise Bestman (born 2000), American singer-songwriter
John G. Bestman (born 1939), Liberian politician
Pewou Bestman (born 1975), Liberian footballer

See also
Walter Bestmann (1907–1958), German SS officer
Best man (disambiguation)